The 2014 Bryant Bulldogs football team represented Bryant University in the 2014 NCAA Division I FCS football season. They were led by eleventh year head coach Marty Fine and played their home games at Bulldog Stadium. They were a member of the Northeast Conference. They finished the season 8–3, 4–2 in NEC play to finish in third place.

Schedule

Ranking movements

References

Bryant
Bryant Bulldogs football seasons
Bryant Bulldogs football